The Canton of Perpignan-7 is a French former canton of Pyrénées-Orientales department, in Languedoc-Roussillon. It was created 16 August 1973 by the decree 73-819. It had 20,211 inhabitants (2012). It was disbanded following the French canton reorganisation which came into effect in March 2015.

Composition
The canton comprised the following communes:
Bompas
Perpignan (partly)

The canton included the following neighbourhoods of Perpignan:
 Les Platanes
 Les Coves
 Clos-Banet
 Mas Vermeil
 Route de Canet
 Massilia
 Mas Llaró
 Château-Roussillon

References 

Perpignan 7
2015 disestablishments in France
States and territories disestablished in 2015